The Egyptian Patriotic Movement, or Egyptian National Movement is a political party initiated by former presidential candidate Ahmed Shafik and Mohamed Abu Hamed, former vice chairman of the Free Egyptians Party and founder of the Life of the Egyptians Party.

Overview
Abdel Rehim Aly, the secretary general of the party, has stated that the group would unite with any party that isn't aligned with the Muslim Brotherhood. Shafiq stated on 8 April 2013 that he was open to an alliance with the National Salvation Front (NSF); George Ishaq, a co-founder of the NSF, has stated that Shafiq was "not welcome" in the coalition. The supreme committee of the Egyptian Patriotic Movement accused the NSF of "enormous political naiveté" and pointed out that many current members of the NSF were also part of the Mubarak regime.  The political program is set out on their website.

The Egyptian Patriotic Movement has recently gone into opposition to current president Abdel Fattah el-Sisi. On 13 December 2017, three of its members were arrested for allegedly harming national security by spreading false information.

Platform 
The party platform calls for:
 Political and economic reform.
 Preserving the civilian nature of the society and state.
 The right to establish groups and unions.
 Achieving social justice.
 Advocating democracy within state affairs.

References

External links
Egyptian Patriotic Movement website

2012 establishments in Egypt
Political parties established in 2012
Political parties in Egypt
Secularism in Egypt